, nicknamed "Kosa", is a former Nippon Professional Baseball infielder and the current coach of the Chiba Lotte Marines.

Makoto Kosaka is well known for his fast running skills (50m in 5.6 seconds and 100m in 11.2 seconds.)

References

 Baseball Reference
 

1973 births
Living people
Baseball people from Miyagi Prefecture
Japanese baseball players
Nippon Professional Baseball infielders
Chiba Lotte Marines players
Yomiuri Giants players
Tohoku Rakuten Golden Eagles players
Nippon Professional Baseball Rookie of the Year Award winners
Japanese baseball coaches
Nippon Professional Baseball coaches